Sainte-Jeanne-d'Arc is a parish municipality in La Mitis Regional County Municipality in the Bas-Saint-Laurent region of Quebec, Canada.  Its population in the Canada 2021 Census was 217.

Demographics 

See also
 List of parish municipalities in Quebec

References

External links

Parish municipalities in Quebec
Incorporated places in Bas-Saint-Laurent